Club Deportivo  La Salle ó Club Deportivo San Pedro was a Honduran football club.

History
They changed their name to San Pedro in 1966.

Achievements
Segunda División
Runners-up (2): 1969–70, 1973

See also
Football in Honduras

References

Defunct football clubs in Honduras